A hopper car (US) or hopper wagon (UIC) is a type of railroad freight car used to transport loose bulk commodities such as coal, ore, grain, and track ballast. Two main types of hopper car exist: covered hopper cars, which are equipped with a roof, and open hopper cars, which do not have a roof.

This type of car is distinguished from a gondola car in that it has opening doors on the underside or on the sides to discharge its cargo. The development of the hopper car went along with the development of automated handling of such commodities, with automated loading and unloading facilities.

Covered hopper cars are used for bulk cargo such as grain, sugar, and fertilizer that must be protected from exposure to the weather. Open hopper cars are used for commodities such as coal, which can suffer exposure with less detrimental effect. Hopper cars have been used by railways worldwide whenever automated cargo handling has been desired. "Ore jennies" is predominantly a term for shorter open hopper cars hauling taconite by the Duluth, Missabe and Iron Range Railway on Minnesota's Iron Range.

A rotary car dumper permits the use of simpler and more compact (because sloping ends are not required) gondola cars instead of hoppers. Covered hoppers, though, are still in widespread use.

These are known as "Dual-purpose" hoppers, a type of the car referring to coal hopper car with rotary coupler on one end or on both ends. They can be used in both rotary or bottom-dump operations.

Gallery

Special hopper trains 
The Coke Express, a  CSX unit train of hopper cars loaded with coke, with the words "Coke Express" painted on the sides of the hoppers.

Typical American freight car weights and wheel loads 

Increase in wheel loads has important implications for the rail infrastructure needed to accommodate future grain hopper car shipments. The weight of the car is transmitted to the rails and the underlying track structure through these wheel loads. As wheel loads increase, track maintenance expenses increase and the ability of a given rail weight, ballast depth, and tie configuration to handle prolonged rail traffic decreases. Moreover, the ability of a given bridge to handle prolonged rail traffic also decreases as wheel loads increase. The axle load is twice the wheel load.

Gallery

Etymology 
The word "hopper", meaning a "container with a narrow opening at bottom", goes back to the thirteenth century, and is found in Chaucer's story "The Reeve's Tale" (written late fourteenth century) in reference to a machine for grinding grain into flour.

See also 
 Gravity wagon, also called a slant wagon
 Victorian Railways hopper wagons

References

Further reading 
 Bernard Ciry, "Les wagons-trémies à céréales et à bogies", :fr:Rail Miniature Flash, Paris, Rigel Editions, juin 2018, pages 28-41.

External links 

 Union Pacific #7801 – Photos and short history of an example of a typical self-clearing, open-top triple hopper
 Rail car manufacturing
 Guide to Rail Cars 

Freight rolling stock